Ontrack or ONTRACK may refer to:
 ONTRACK, former trading name for New Zealand Railways Corporation (NZRC), now KiwiRail Network
 OnTrack, a commuter railway in New York state, U.S.
 Ontrack, a computer data recovery company acquired by Kroll Inc. to form Kroll Ontrack
 Ontrack software, author of the 1980s–1990s computer utility suite Disk Manager for DOS
 OnTrac, a regional parcel carrier in the Western United States

See also
 "On Track", a song from Tame Impala's 2020 studio album The Slow Rush